Sporosarcina saromensis is a Gram-positive, endospore-forming, rod-shaped and aerobic bacterium from the genus of Sporosarcina.

References

External links
Type strain of Sporosarcina saromensis at BacDive -  the Bacterial Diversity Metadatabase

Bacillales
Bacteria described in 2007